William Tell is a biennial aerial gunnery competition with fighter aircraft held by the  United States Air Force (USAF) in every even-numbered year. In the competition, teams representing the various major commands of the USAF compete in live-fire exercises, using towed banner targets for gun engagements, and obsolete fighters converted into unmanned target drones (currently QF-4 Phantoms) for air-to-air missile engagements. The competition occurs during even-numbered years, while Hawgsmoke occurs during odd-numbered years.  (Hawgsmoke replaced the earlier  Gunsmoke.)

The William Tell competition in  1972 was held at Tyndall AFB in Florida. There were twelve teams competing in total: three F-101 Voodoo teams, three F-102 Delta Dagger teams, and six F-106 Delta Dart teams. 1972 was also when the first "Top Gun" award was won.  It was won by a Royal Canadian Air Force team from the first French-Canadian fighter squadron, the 425 All Weather Fighter Squadron "Les Alouettes". The recipients were Capt. Lowell Butters (Pilot) and Capt. Douglas Danko (Navigator). They were flying the McDonnell CF-101 Voodoo.

The very first competition was held in 1949 at a test airfield outside of Las Vegas, NV, now called Nellis AFB.  The winners of this first competition was the 332nd Fighter group and consisted of Capt. Alva Temple, Lt. Col James Harvey III, Lt. Col. Harry Stewart, and alternate 1st Lt. Halbert Alexander.

References

External links
History of the competition
Tuskegee Airmen Won First Air Force Top Gun
Tuskegee Airmen Compete/Win 1st Ever Weapons Meet

United States Air Force exercises